Shai Livnat is an Israeli swimmer who has represented Israel at numerous international competitions such as the 2006 LEN European Championships and holds the Israeli record for the 400m free as well as the Maccabiah record in the 200m free.

Footnotes 

Living people
Israeli Jews
Israeli male swimmers
Maccabiah Games medalists in swimming
Maccabiah Games gold medalists for Israel
Maccabiah Games silver medalists for Israel
Competitors at the 2005 Maccabiah Games
1984 births
Sportspeople from Haifa
Israeli people of Romanian-Jewish descent